Aouelloul is an impact crater in Mauritania. It is located in the Akchar Desert, part of the Sahara Desert, approximately 50 km southeast of Atar.

Its age is estimated to be 3.1 ± 0.3 million years (Pliocene).

Tektite is found around the crater, although very few meteorites have been found. Zerga meteorite was found in 1973 at the bottom of the crater, but scientists are unsure if it is the same meteorite (or even a part of it) that formed the crater.

References

Impact craters of Mauritania
Piacenzian